Myrtle Devenish (29 July 1912 – 21 January 2007) was a British film actress. She appeared in Terry Gilliam's 1985 cult film Brazil, in a 1988 episode of Crimewatch, and had a role in the 1980s drama Together.  

Devenish was born in Ebbw Vale, Wales.

Filmography

References

External links
 
 Devenish at Aveleyman.com

Welsh film actresses
1912 births
2007 deaths